Manchester is a home rule-class city in Clay County, Kentucky, in the United States. It is the seat of its county and the home of a minimum- and medium-security federal prison. The city's population was 1,255 at the 2010 census.

History
The town was founded to be the seat of the newly formed Clay Co. in 1807 on a  parcel near the Lower Goose Creek Salt Works. The county court stipulated that the town be named Greenville in honor of the War-of-1812 general who gave the county its name. The Greenville in Muhlenberg County had already preëmpted that name, however, and it was changed to "Manchester" in December. There was a local legend in the town that this was in honor of the hometown of Gen. Garrard's second wife Lucy Lees, but a prominent local family, the Hollingsworth, were originally from Manchester, England.  Rennick points out that Lucy Lees was born well after the naming of the city. He opines that it is more likely that the local businessmen simply wanted a name evocative of the English industrial success.

Geography
Manchester is located at  (37.152818, -83.763403).

Demographics

As of the census of 2010, there were 1,255 people, 579 households, and 332 families living in the city. The racial makeup of the city was 92.5% White, 6.3% African American, 0% Native American, 0.1% Asian, 0.2% from other races, and 0.1% from two or more races. Hispanic or Latino of any race were 1% of the population.

There were 579 households, out of which 23.3% had children under the age of 18 living with them, 33.5% were married couples living together, 19% had a female householder with no husband present, and 42.7% were non-families. 37.8% of all households were made up of individuals, and 19.2% had someone living alone who was 65 years of age or older. The average household size was 2.16 and the average family size was 2.84.

Education
Manchester has a lending library, the Clay County Public Library.

Media
Manchester is the city of license cited by four radio stations:
 WWXL
 WKLB
 WTBK
 WWLT

Notable people
 Bert T. Combs – Former jurist and 50th Governor of Kentucky.
 Theophilus T. Garrard – A politician and Union general in the American Civil War. 
 Richie Farmer – Former University of Kentucky shooting guard and Kentucky Commissioner of Agriculture.

References

Further reading

External links
 claycountykentucky.org
 The Manchester Enterprise
 Manchester News and Photos at Claylive.com

 

Cities in Kentucky
Cities in Clay County, Kentucky
County seats in Kentucky
Populated places established in 1844
1844 establishments in Kentucky